AmigaOne is a series of computers intended to run AmigaOS 4 developed by Hyperion Entertainment, as a successor to the Amiga series by Commodore International. Earlier models were produced by Eyetech, and were based on the Teron series of PowerPC POP mainboards. In September 2009, Hyperion Entertainment secured an exclusive licence for the AmigaOne name and subsequently new AmigaOne computers were released by A-Eon Technology and Acube Systems.

History

AmigaOne by Eyetech (2000–05)

Originally in 2000, AmigaOne was the name of a project for new computer hardware to run the Amiga Digital Environment (DE), later plans replaced by AmigaOS 4. Initially it was managed by Eyetech and designed by the German company Escena GmbH. The AmigaOne motherboard was to be available in two models, the AmigaOne-1200 and the AmigaOne-4000 as expansions for the Amiga 1200 and Amiga 4000 computers. This would probably not have been actually possible. This AmigaOne project was cancelled in the design stage in 2001, mostly due to the inability to find or design a suitable northbridge chip. Eyetech, who at this point had invested funds into the project, was forced instead to license the Teron CX board from Mai to form the basis of the new AmigaONE computer range. The first fruit of this partnership with Mai, AmigaOne SE, was announced with a connector for an optionally attached Amiga 1200, in order to use the old custom chips of an Amiga for backwards compatibility. However, no such solution was ever introduced.

The main difference between the ATX-format AmigaOne SE and XE was that the AmigaOne SE had a soldered-on 600 MHz PowerPC 750CXe processor, whereas the AmigaOne XE used a CPU board attached to a MegArray connector on the motherboard. While the MegArray connector is physically similar to the Apple Power Mac G4 CPU daughtercard connector, it is not electrically compatible. There were G3 and G4 options with a maximum clock frequency of 800 MHz and 933 MHz. The G4 module originally used a Freescale 7451 processor which was later changed to a Freescale 7455, both without level 3 cache. The G4 CPU runs hotter and requires a better heatsink than that supplied on some machines. Consequently, the G4 was often supplied underclocked to run at 800 MHz. In 2007 Acube offered 1.267 GHz 7457. The Micro-A1 was announced in two configurations, under the Micro-A1 I (Industrial) and Micro-A1 C (Consumer) labels. Only the C configuration was produced.

Both AmigaOneG3-XE and AmigaOneG4-XE has four 32-bit PCI-slots (3× 33 MHz, 1× 66 MHz) and one AGP-2x slot. The Micro-A1 has only one 32-bit PCI-slot and an integrated Radeon 7000 via AGP with dedicated 32 MB VRAM.

AmigaOne (SE and XE) motherboards had several hardware issues including conflicts between the onboard IDE and Ethernet controllers, problems with USB device detection and initially no support for the on-board AC97 audio. Due to the mistaken belief that the on-board AC97 audio could not be supported, the AC97 codec was removed from later builds of the motherboard. The technical issues preventing AC97 audio support were later resolved.

When the AmigaOne boards first became available, AmigaOS 4 was not ready: they were supplied with various Linux distributions. From April 2004 onwards, boards were shipped for developers with a pre-release version of OS4. The Final Update of OS4.0 was released in December 2006, for AmigaOne computers only, with the PowerUP version being released in December 2007. AmigaOS 4.1 for AmigaOne was released in September 2008.

MAI Logic Inc. went bankrupt, and consequently the supply of Eyetech AmigaOnes dried up. Eyetech Group Ltd retired from the market in 2005, selling their remaining Amiga business to Amiga Kit.

AmigaOne by Hyperion Entertainment (2009–present)
In September 2009, as part of the resolution of a dispute over ownership of AmigaOS Hyperion was granted (among other provisions of the Settlement Agreement with Amiga, Inc.) an exclusive licence for the AmigaOne (or Amiga One) name. This Settlement Agreement thus created a legal basis for a new generation of AmigaOne computers.

In February 2010, a new Belgian company A-Eon Technology CVBA, in co-operation with Hyperion Entertainment, officially announced a new AmigaOne model, the AmigaOne X1000, first presented at the Vintage Computer festival at Bletchley Park in June 2010. The project was delayed but the new platform was launched in 2012 with AmigaOS 4.1.5.

In September 2011, Acube Systems introduced the AmigaOne 500 based on a Sam460ex mainboard.

In October 2011, Hyperion Entertainment announced that it was launching an AmigaOne netbook in mid-2012, but it was announced at Amiwest 2013 that the netbook project had been cancelled.

Also at Amiwest 2013, A-Eon Technology Ltd, a British computer company, announced three new AmigaOne motherboards, with the project named Cyrus. A-Eon had a list of proposed names which could be voted for and in January 2014 A-Eon Technology announced names for new models as AmigaOne X5000/20, AmigaOne X5000/40 and AmigaOne X3500. The new motherboards were aimed as replacements for the AmigaOne X1000. The AmigaOne X5000/20 was released in October 2016 and - unlike the X1000 - sold via various distributors. ArsTechnica review of the AmigaOne X5000 commended its compatibility with old Amiga applications and games, but criticised the very high price and lack of new software.

Lastly, A-Eon Technology Ltd announced at Amiwest 2013 that A-Eon had signed a 1.2 million-dollar investment contract with Ultra Varisys for the ongoing design, development and manufacture of PowerPC hardware for its AmigaOne line of desktop computers.

In January 2015, Acube Systems started selling AmigaOne 500 computers based on the Sam460cr motherboard, a cost reduced version of original Sam460ex. Features that were removed included the Silicon Motion SM502 embedded MoC and 1× SATA2 port.

In autumn 2015, A-Eon Technology Ltd announced a new motherboard with the project development name Tabor based on a P1022 1.2 GHz SoC. The motherboard design is a microATX form factor with single PCIe slot and SODIMM memory slots. The full system is to be designated as the AmigaOne A1222.

Models and variants

Operating systems
Linux for PowerPC.
AmigaOS versions 4.0, 4.1.
MorphOS support for AmigaOne 500 / SAM460 was announced in 2012 and introduced with MorphOS 3.8. Support for X5000 was introduced with MorphOS 3.10.
FreeBSD.

Other AmigaOS4 compatible models
The Sam440 mainboard (complete with AMCC PowerPC 440EP SoC) is an embedded motherboard launched by Acube Systems in September 2007. AmigaOS 4 was released for the Sam440 in October 2008.

The Sam460ex mainboard (complete with AMCC 460ex SoC, PowerPC 440 core) is an embedded motherboard launched by Acube Systems in April 2010. AmigaOS 4 was released for the Sam460ex in January 2011.
A cost reduced version, the Sam460cr, was released with AmigaOS 4.1 Final Edition on January 8, 2015.

The Pegasos II mainboard (complete with PPC G3 and G4 CPU) is a MicroATX motherboard launched by Genesi and discontinued in 2006. AmigaOS 4 was released for the Pegasos II in January 2009.

See also

Amiga models and variants
Sam440
Sam460ex
Pegasos
AmigaOS
MorphOS
AROS
Commodore International
Commodore USA

References

External links
Eyetech and Mai Logic - Mai Logic Incorporated And Eyetech Group Limited Partner to Capture New Amiga Territory
The Register - Amiga returns with AmigaOne PPC hardware
Eyetech - Archived page containing AmigaOne update and information on the AmigaOne partnership between Eyetech, Hyperion Entertainment and Amiga Inc.
Amiga Inc - Amiga status announcement

Amiga computers
PowerPC mainboards
AmigaOS